The Museum of Bohuslän is a museum in the Swedish province of Bohuslän, established in Uddevalla in 1863.

References

External links
 

Uddevalla
Bohuslän
Museums in Västra Götaland County